The London–Surrey Classic (also known as the RideLondon–Surrey Classic) was an annual  men's professional one-day road cycling race, starting and finishing in London and routed via the picturesque Surrey Hills. The first race of its kind was the London–Surrey Cycle Classic, on 14 August 2011, a 1.2 classification 140 km preparatory event for the 2012 Summer Olympics, which was won by sprinter Mark Cavendish. The men's and women's Olympic road races were held on a longer variation of the same course the following year. On 4 August 2013, the race found a permanent home as part of the Prudential RideLondon weekend, a two-day cycling festival held in London, a legacy event of the Olympics.

The Prudential RideLondon–Surrey Classic was part of the UCI World Tour between 2017 and 2019. Following the cancellation of the 2020 and 2021 events due to the COVID-19 pandemic and the withdrawal of support from Surrey County Council, the men's race did not return in 2022, with the RideLondon festival including a 3 day elite women's race (RideLondon Classique) instead.

History

Origins 

As part of the London Prepares test events for London 2012 Olympics and Paralympics a one-off one-day  cycle race was organised for 14 August 2011 acting as a test event for the Road Cycling events to be held the following year. The race was named the London-Surrey Cycle Classic and was part of the 2010–11 UCI Europe Tour as a 1.2 category event.

The race started and finished on The Mall in London and featured two laps of a  circuit centred on Box Hill in Surrey. 138 riders from 19 national teams and 10 trade teams took part in the race, and was won by Mark Cavendish in a sprint finish.

2012 Summer Olympics 

The 2012 Summer Olympics held road cycling races for both men and women on a largely similar course to that of the London-Surrey Cycle Classic held the previous year.

RideLondon–Surrey Classic 
The RideLondon weekend, including the RideLondon–Surrey Classic, was announced by the Mayor of London Boris Johnson on 10 August 2012, less than two weeks after the Olympic Road Cycling races. RideLondon is managed by the London & Surrey Cycling Partnership, a joint venture between the organisers of the London Marathon and The Tour of Britain.

The inaugural RideLondon–Surrey Classic was run as a 1.1 category event on the 2013 UCI Europe Tour. The UCI upgraded the classification for the 2014 race which was run as a 1.HC category event on the 2014 UCI Europe Tour; the same classification as Paris–Tours and Milano–Torino.

UCI World Tour status
The RideLondon event director, Hugh Brasher, stated his ambitions to attain UCI World Tour status for the RideLondon–Surrey Classic by 2016. This was backed up by positive rider reaction following the inaugural race, including from Arnaud Démare's teammate Dominique Rollin. In March 2016 the race organisation applied for WorldTour status from the 2017 event and in August 2016 the UCI confirmed that the race would be promoted to the WorldTour from 2017. Surrey County Council agreed to support the RideLondon events until 2018, with an option of a further two-year extension.

Cancellation 
The 2020 and 2021 events were cancelled due to the COVID-19 pandemic. Following the withdrawal of title sponsor Prudential and Surrey County Council, the event has concentrated in Central London from 2022 with an 3-day elite women's race, the RideLondon Classique. In June 2021, organisers of the event confirmed that the men's race would not return.

Route 

The RideLondon–Surrey Classic route was a variation of the course used for the 2012 Summer Olympics. The route featured both categorised climbs and intermediate sprint points.

Riders started from the Queen Elizabeth Olympic Park close to the Olympic Velodrome before passing close to Canary Wharf and the Tower of London on the way through central London. Leaving London by the A4 the route passes through Richmond Park, Kingston upon Thames and Hampton Court Palace. In Surrey the route passed through Weybridge and Ripley on the way to the first of the categorised climbs and the leafy villages of the Surrey Hills.

Multiple laps of hilly terrain in the vicinity of Dorking incorporated further categorised climbs, including Leith Hill - the highest point in South-East England. On the return to London the route took in the final categorised climb of Box Hill before the largely flat run-in via Oxshott, Kingston upon Thames, Wimbledon and Putney. The final kilometres followed the Embankment, past the Palace of Westminster, along Whitehall and turning left through Admiralty Arch before the finish on The Mall.

Sprints classification 
Intermediate Sprints counted towards the sprints classification; the points distribution for this classification is as follows:

Note that points were not awarded at the finish line.

King of the Mountains classification 
Categorised climbs counted towards the King of the Mountains classification; the points distribution for this classification is as follows:

The categorised climbs that featured in the RideLondon–Surrey Classic included:

Winners

Overall winners 

 (see 2012 Olympic road race)

 due to COVID-19 pandemic
 due to COVID-19 pandemic

Overall winners by nationality

Sprints classification winners

King of the Mountains classification winners

Records 
 The highest number of finishers was in 2013 - 131 out of 147 starters completed the course within the time limit.

References

External links 

 

 
Cycle races in England
UCI World Tour races
UCI Europe Tour races
Recurring sporting events established in 2013
2013 establishments in England
Box Hill, Surrey